Elliot Ingber (born August 24, 1941) is an American guitarist. In 1966, he joined Frank Zappa's Mothers of Invention and was featured on their debut album Freak Out! After being fired from the band by Zappa following an incident onstage where he tripped on LSD and was unaware that his amplifier was not switched on (according to Jimmy Carl Black), Ingber helped form Fraternity of Man, which released two albums. He subsequently joined Captain Beefheart's Magic Band where he was given the stage name Winged Eel Fingerling by Beefheart. In the sleeve notes to The Spotlight Kid (1972), Captain Beefheart likens Ingber to "a chrome black eyebrow / rolled out real long" and also "a paper brow magnifying glass / fried brown, edge scorched, yoked / like a squeak from a speaker / behind forehead of the time." In 1995, Ingber reformed Fraternity of Man with the original vocalist and co-author of "Don't Bogart that Joint", Lawrence "Stash" Wagner, to record and release a third album released under the Malibu Records label.

Discography

References

The Mothers of Invention members
American rock guitarists
American male guitarists
The Magic Band members
Living people
1941 births
Lead guitarists
Rhythm guitarists
Guitarists from Los Angeles
20th-century American guitarists